Serine/threonine-protein phosphatase PP1-gamma catalytic subunit is an enzyme that in humans is encoded by the PPP1CC gene.

Interactions
PPP1CC has been shown to interact with PPP1R15A, SMARCB1, TLX1 and PPP1R9B.

References

Further reading